Yakovleva is a rural locality (a village) in Karachevsky District, Bryansk Oblast, Russia. The population was 9 as of 2010. There is 1 street in the village.

Geography 
Yakovleva is located 51 km east of Karachev (the district's administrative centre) by road. Alymova is the nearest rural locality.

References 

Rural localities in Karachevsky District